Troy Williams (born December 30, 1994) is an American professional basketball player who last played for the Blackwater Bossing of the Philippine Basketball Association (PBA). He previously attended and played college basketball for Indiana.

High school career
Williams played his first three seasons at Phoebus High School in Hampton, Virginia before transferring to Oak Hill Academy for his senior season. As a senior in 2012–13, he averaged 16.2 points, 7.5 rebounds, 4.0 assists and 2.0 blocks during the regular season, compiling nine double-doubles. He was named Gatorade Player of the Year for the state of Virginia and led Oak Hill to a regular season record of 34–5 and an appearance in the National High School Invitational.

College career
As a freshman at Indiana in 2013–14, Williams started all 32 games, averaging 7.3 points and 4.4 rebounds while shooting 50.9 percent from the floor. On March 10, 2014, he was named Big Ten Freshman of the Week.

As a sophomore in 2014–15, Williams played in 32 games, making 28 starts. He was named Big Ten Player of the Week on December 22, Oscar Robertson National Player of the Week on December 23, and honorable mention All-Big Ten at the season's end. He averaged 7.4 rebounds per game to lead the team, while his 13.0 points per game ranked third on the team. He recorded 11 points, 12 rebounds and four assists in the second round of the NCAA Tournament against Wichita State, marking his sixth double-double of the season.

Following his sophomore season, Williams considered entering the 2015 NBA draft, but decided to return to the Hoosiers for his junior year.

As a junior in 2015–16, Williams earned third-team All-Big Ten honors. He played in 35 games and made 34 starts, averaging 13.3 points and 5.8 rebounds per game.

On May 25, 2016, Williams declared for the NBA draft, forgoing his final year of college eligibility.

College statistics

|-
| style="text-align:left;"| 2013–14
| style="text-align:left;"| Indiana
| 32 || 32 || 21.5 || .509 || .207 || .675 || 4.4 || .9 || .8 || .4 || 7.3
|-
| style="text-align:left;"| 2014–15
| style="text-align:left;"| Indiana
| 32 || 28 || 27.6 || .540 || .462 || .742 || 7.4 || 2.0 || 1.0 || .5 || 13.0
|-
| style="text-align:left;"| 2015–16
| style="text-align:left;"| Indiana
| 35 || 34 || 26.2 || .513 || .347 || .691 || 5.8 || 2.0 || 1.1 || .8 || 13.3
|-
| style="text-align:center;" colspan="2"| Career
| 99 || 94 || 25.1 || .522 || .325 || .705 || 5.9 || 1.6 || 1.0 || .6 || 11.3

Professional career

Memphis Grizzlies (2016–2017)
After going undrafted in the 2016 NBA draft, Williams joined the Phoenix Suns for the 2016 NBA Summer League. In six games at Las Vegas, he averaged 12.3 points, 4.3 rebounds and 1.7 steals in 22.2 minutes per game. On August 8, 2016, he signed with the Memphis Grizzlies. Williams secured an opening-night roster spot after impressing the Grizzlies during training camp and preseason. He made his debut for the Grizzlies in their second game of the season on October 29, 2016, recording three points, one assist and two steals in nine minutes off the bench in a 111–104 loss to the New York Knicks. On November 26, 2016, he had an 18-point effort in a 110–107 win over the Miami Heat. On January 30, 2017, he was waived by the Grizzlies. During his time with Memphis, Williams received multiple assignments to the Iowa Energy of NBA Development League.

Iowa Energy (2017)
On February 3, 2017, Williams was acquired by the Iowa Energy after being waived by the Grizzlies. On February 18, 2017, Williams won the 2017 D-League Dunk Contest.

Houston Rockets (2017–2018)
On March 10, 2017, Williams signed a 10-day contract with the Houston Rockets, and was immediately assigned to the Rio Grande Valley Vipers. On March 20, 2017, he signed with the Rockets for the rest of the season, despite having not appeared in a game during his 10-day contract. On April 2, 2017, he was recalled from the D-League and went on to score 18 of his career-high 21 points in the first half of the Rockets' 123–116 win over the Phoenix Suns.

On July 25, 2017, Williams re-signed with the Rockets. He was waived on February 14, 2018 to make room for newly acquired Joe Johnson.

New York Knicks (2018)
On February 21, 2018, Williams signed a 10-day contract with the New York Knicks and on March 13, he signed a multi-year contract. On April 2, the Knicks announced he would miss the rest of the season with a broken jaw. On July 16, 2018, he was officially waived by the Knicks.

Sacramento Kings (2018–2019)
On July 27, 2018, Williams signed with the New Orleans Pelicans, but was later waived by the team on October 17, 2018.

On October 20, Williams signed with the Sacramento Kings, on a two-way contract with their G League affiliate, the Stockton Kings.

On October 27, 2019, Williams was included in the training camp roster of the Northern Arizona Suns.

Carpegna Prosciutto Basket Pesaro (2019–2020)
On December 12, 2019, Williams signed with Carpegna Prosciutto Basket Pesaro in the Italian Serie A until the end of the season. After the interruption of all the basketball competitions due to the outbreak of the coronavirus, however, he decided to quit the team on March 9, 2020.

Taoyuan Leopards (2021–2022)
On November 21, 2021, Williams signed with the Taoyuan Leopards of the T1 League. On June 27, 2022, he re-signed with the team.

Blackwater Bossing (2023) 
In February 2023, Williams signed with the Blackwater Bossing of the Philippine Basketball Association (PBA) to replace Shawn Glover as the team's import for the 2023 PBA Governors' Cup. In his debut for the team on February 9, Williams recorded 55 points, 14 rebounds, and five assists on a 106–119 loss to the Terrafirma Dyip.

NBA career statistics

Regular season

|-
| style="text-align:left;"rowspan="2"| 
| style="text-align:left;"| Memphis
| 24 || 13 || 17.4 || .415 || .244 || .600 || 1.8 || .7 || 1.0 || .3 || 5.3
|-
| style="text-align:left;"| Houston
| 6 || 3 || 23.5 || .500 || .381 || .857 || 4.0 || 1.0 || .5 || .1 || 9.6
|-
| style="text-align:left;"| 
| style="text-align:left;"| Houston
| 4 || 0 || 4.3 || .222 || .000 || .333 || 1.0 || .3 || .3 || .0 || 1.3
|-
| style="text-align:left;"| 
| style="text-align:left;"| New York
| 17 || 1 || 17.1 || .490 || .333 || .704 || 3.5 || .9 || 1.1 || .2 || 7.5
|-
| style="text-align:left;"| 
| style="text-align:left;"| Sacramento
| 21 || 0 || 14.9 || .449 || .299 || .600 || 2.8 || .5 || .5 || .4 || 5.3
|- class="sortbottom"
| style="text-align:center;" colspan=2| Career
| 72 || 17 || 16.3 || .449 || .299 || .649 || 2.7 || .7 || .8 || .3 || 6.0

Playoffs

|-
| style="text-align:left;"| 2017
| style="text-align:left;"| Houston
| 5 || 0 || 3.8 || .000 || .000 || .500 || 1.4 || .2 || .0 || .0 || .2
|-
| style="text-align:center;" colspan="2"| Career
| 5 || 0 || 3.8 || .000 || .000 || .500 || 1.4 || .2 || .0 || .6 || .2

Personal life
Williams was raised by his mother, Patty, and his guardian (uncle) Marcellus Spencer "Boo" Williams Jr., who played collegiately for Saint Joseph's University and now runs the Boo Williams AAU program and Boo Williams Nike Invitational in his native Hampton, Virginia.

References

External links
 
 Indiana Hoosiers bio
 WashingtonPost.com profile

1994 births
Living people
21st-century African-American sportspeople
African-American basketball players
American expatriate basketball people in Italy
American expatriate basketball people in the Philippines
American expatriate basketball people in Taiwan
American men's basketball players
Basketball players from Virginia
Blackwater Bossing players
Houston Rockets players
Indiana Hoosiers men's basketball players
Iowa Energy players
Memphis Grizzlies players
New York Knicks players
Oak Hill Academy (Mouth of Wilson, Virginia) alumni
Philippine Basketball Association imports
Rio Grande Valley Vipers players
Sacramento Kings players
Small forwards
Sportspeople from Hampton, Virginia
Stockton Kings players
Taoyuan Leopards players
T1 League imports
Undrafted National Basketball Association players
Victoria Libertas Pallacanestro players